20th Century Masters – The Millennium Collection: The Best of The Jets is the second greatest hits album by Tongan-American family band The Jets, released on October 9th, 2001, by MCA Records.

This album contains many of their biggest hits, including "Crush on You", "Sendin' All My Love", "You Got It All", "Rocket 2 U", "Cross My Broken Heart" and "Make It Real". It is far more comprehensive than the group's first greatest hits package released in 1990, The Best of The Jets. The only singles this package omits are "Anytime", "Christmas in My Heart", "Somebody to Love Me", & "Under Any Moon".

Track listing
 "Crush on You" – 4:30
 "Private Number" – 4:03
 "You Got It All" – 4:08
 "Curiosity" – 4:58
 "Cross My Broken Heart" – 4:07
 "I Do You" – 3:38
 "Rocket 2 U" – 4:18
 "Make It Real" – 4:17
 "Sendin' All My Love" – 3:49
 "You Better Dance" – 3:51
 "The Same Love" – 3:58
 "Special Kinda Love" – 4:33

References

The Jets (band) compilation albums
2001 greatest hits albums
Jets, The
MCA Records compilation albums
Albums produced by David Z (music producer)
Albums produced by Don Powell
Albums produced by Aaron Zigman
Albums produced by Jerry Knight
Albums produced by Bobby Nunn (R&B musician)
Albums produced by Stephen Bray